Over the Top is the first studio album of South Korean boy band Infinite. It was released on July 21, 2011. The song "Be Mine" was used to promote the album. A repackaged version of the album was released on September 26, 2011 with the song "Paradise" as the lead single.

Composition
Several songs on the album and the singles "Be Mine" and "Paradise" were produced by Han Jaeho and Kim Seungsoo and written by Song Sooyoon, who are also known for producing songs for Kara, f(x), Rainbow, SS501, Nine Muses and more.

Promotions

"Be Mine"
The group started promoting the track "Be Mine" on July 23, 2011 on MBC's Show! Music Core and continued to promote on shows like M! Countdown, Music Bank, and Inkigayo. The songs "1/3" and "Amazing" were used for Infinite's special comeback week performances. Infinite won their first music show award for "Be Mine" (and also the first award for the group since their debut in 2010) on September 1, 2011, on M! Countdown, and won another award the following week. The group promoted the track in a remix version from September 2–11. Promotions for the song ended on September 18.

"Paradise"
Promotions for "Paradise" started on September 29, on Mnet's M! Countdown. It was also promoted on Music Bank, Music Core and Inkigayo. "Paradise" won a mutizen award on October 9 on Inkigayo and won another award on October 13 on M! Countdown. "Paradise" promotions ended on November 5.

Track listing

Notes
 On the iTunes Store version and physical version of Over the Top, the song "Real Story" has a hidden track that starts at 6:48.
 The physical version of "Paradise" has another hidden track on track 14. It is the same included in Over the Top but with a conversation between the members in the beginning. This hidden track was later released as a full song on the group's third mini album Infinitize, with the title "In The Summer".

Charts

Over the Top

Paradise

Sales and certifications 
Physical sales

Release history

References

External links
 

2011 albums
Infinite (group) albums
Korean-language albums
Woollim Entertainment albums